Rachel A. Morello-Frosch is an American environmental health scientist. She is a professor in the Department of Environmental Science, Policy and Management & School of Public Health at the University of California, Berkeley. In 2022, Morello-Frosch was elected a Member of the National Academy of Medicine for being a "renowned expert on structural determinants of environmental health inequities" and a "leader in the application of community-engaged data science."

Early life and education
Morello-Frosch was born to parents Martha Morello and Norbert Frosch. Her mother was a literature professor at Ohio State University and the University of California, Santa Cruz. Morello-Frosch completed her Bachelor of Science degree, Master's degree in public health, and her Ph.D. at the University of California, Berkeley (UC Berkeley). While completing her graduate degrees, she underwent chemotherapy for breast cancer. She was also named a 1995 Fellow of the Robert & Patricia Switzer Foundation.

Career
Following her PhD, Morello-Frosch completed a National Science Foundation (NSF) post-doctoral fellowship and U.C. President's postdoctoral fellowship before teaching at San Francisco State's College of Health and Human Services. She eventually became an assistant professor of environmental studies at Brown University. In this role, she co-authored a study on air pollution in Los Angeles with Manuel Pastor, Jr. Their study found that the schools with the highest air pollution had the highest minority student enrollment. They also found that air pollution is associated with decreased achievement in school. In 2004, Morello-Frosch was appointed the Robert and Nancy Carney Assistant Professor of Community Health and Environmental Studies Assistant Professor of Community Health and Environmental Studies. Following her promotion, Morello-Frosch and Bill Jesdale publishing findings that suggested that cancer risks from air toxics are greatest in the nation's highly segregated metropolitan areas. She also received the 2005 William G. McLoughlin Award for Teaching Excellence in the Social Sciences.

Morello-Frosch eventually returned to UC Berkeley as an associate professor in their Department of Environmental Science, Policy and Management and School of Public Health. She continued to focus on air pollution and other environmental health and social inequality issues. Due to her focus on climate justice issues, Morello-Frosch received the 2010 Damu Smith Environmental Achievement Award from the Environment Section of the American Public Health Association. During her early tenure at the institution, she became interested in water quality due to the prolonged drought in California from 2011 to 2017. As such, she established the Community Engagement Core - Water Equity Science Shop (CEC-WESS) of the UC Berkeley Superfund Research Program Center. Beyond water quality issues, Morello-Frosch received a 500 Cities Data Challenge grant in 2018 to "develop a nationwide noise model with the 500 Cities data to examine the relationship between environmental noise, sleep patterns, mental health outcomes, and hypertension in American communities."

During the COVID-19 pandemic, Morello-Frosch raised concerns that wildfire smoke could exacerbate COVID-19 as it causes a higher density of tiny aerosol particles in the atmosphere so the virus could survive for longer and travel farther on the particles. In 2021, Morello-Frosch was appointed to sit on the White House Environmental Justice Advisory Council. The following year, she was elected a Member of the National Academy of Medicine for being a "renowned expert on structural determinants of environmental health inequities" and a "leader in the application of community-engaged data science."

Personal life
Morello-Frosch and her husband David Eifler are the adopted parents of linebacker Milo Eifler.

References

External links

Living people
Date of birth missing (living people)
Place of birth missing (living people)
Brown University faculty
San Francisco State University faculty
University of California, Berkeley alumni
University of California, Berkeley faculty
Members of the National Academy of Medicine
21st-century American women scientists
20th-century American women scientists